Derek Patrick Daly (born 11 March 1953) is an Irish former racing driver. He won the 1977 British Formula 3 Championship, and competed as a professional racing driver for 17 years participating in 64 World Championship Formula One Grands Prix, debuting on 2 April 1978. He scored a total of 15 championship points, and also participated in several non-Championship Formula One races. After F1, Daly raced in CART and IMSA, where he achieved much success with Nissan.

Racing career
After honing his skills in the Irish Formula Ford Championship, Daly had his first drive in the European Formula Two Championship in 1977. In 1978 and 1979, he competed in both Formula Two and Formula One, finishing third in the Formula Two championship in both seasons. From 1980 to 1982, he focussed on Formula One, his best year being 1980, when he scored two fourth-place finishes and finished 11th in the Drivers' Championship. His two most memorable moments in F1 both came in the Monaco Grand Prix. In 1980 he crashed spectacularly at the first corner after vaulting three other cars. In 1982 he suddenly found himself in contention for the win when the four cars ahead of him ran into problems with under two laps to go, but ended up on the sidelines himself when his gearbox seized moments later.

In 1982, Daly began driving in the CART series and continued through 1989.  He started 66 CART races, including each Indianapolis 500 from 1983 to 1989, except for 1986.  He finished in the top ten a total of 21 times, including one podium finish, 3rd position, at Milwaukee in 1987. In September 1984 he was nearly killed in a horrible crash in the CART PPG Detroit News Grand Prix 200 at Michigan International Speedway. The front end of his car was sheared off and he suffered multiple injuries including a crushed left ankle, double compound fracture to the left tibia and fibula, fractured left hip socket, severely fractured pelvis, several broken left side ribs, broken left hand, 3rd degree burns to the left arm, dislocated right foot and ankle, deep abrasions and soft tissue to right heel, and internal bleeding.

Daly won the 12 Hours of Sebring in 1990 and 1991 driving a Nissan GTP ZX-Turbo. In 1990, he had the unusual distinction of driving both the first and second-placed cars.

Broadcast and business career
Daly is known in motor sports circles around the world as a driver, writer, broadcaster, racing advisor, and businessman. He runs a professional services company called MotorVation, and had been a commentator for American broadcasts of the Champ Car series, as well as a public speaker. One of the agencies that represents him is the National Speakers Bureau.

In 2018, it was revealed that Daly had used a racist phrase in a radio interview in May 1983. Daly explained he was a foreign driver now in America, driving for an American team, with an American crew, and with an American sponsor—and that if things did not go well, he would be the only nigger in the woodpile. His comment caused an immediate uproar from people listening in Gasoline Alley as they warned him of the volatility of that phrase. Daly apologized and said the phrase had been an Irish colloquialism and was not intended as a racial slur. Once it was revealed, Daly lost his commentator job with WISH-TV.

Daly filed a $25M lawsuit as a result. In the aftermath, his son Conor had his sponsor, Lilly Diabetes, pull their support as he was set to make his NASCAR debut at Road America on 25 August 2018 due to the comments. In 2021, U.S. district court judge Richard L. Young ruled in favor of WISH-TV and the station's former parent company, Nexstar Media Group in all claims in Daly's lawsuit and ordered him to pay Nexstar's legal costs.

Racing record

Career summary

Complete European Formula Two Championship results
(key) (Races in bold indicate pole position; races in italics indicate fastest lap)

Complete Formula One World Championship results
(key)

CART results

24 Hours of Le Mans results

Personal life
Daly became a US citizen and now resides in Carmel, Indiana. He has three sons, Conor, Colin and Christian.

Daly's son Conor is also a racing driver. He made his debut in full-time open-wheel racing in 2012, driving for the Lotus GP team in GP3, before moving GP2 in 2014 driving for Venezuela GP Lazarus. Conor made his IndyCar Series debut in 2013 and has been a full-time driver since 2016. He also competed in the Daytona 500 in 2023, finishing 29th. 

Daly's niece, Nicola Daly, is an Ireland women's field hockey international and was a member of the squad that won the silver medal at the 2018 Women's Hockey World Cup. She also works as a data engineer for Juncos Racing.

References

External links

Derek Daly Designs (course design business)
Profile at grandprix.com

1953 births
British Formula Three Championship drivers
Indianapolis 500 drivers
Champ Car drivers
Irish racing drivers
Irish Formula One drivers
Hesketh Formula One drivers
Ensign Formula One drivers
Tyrrell Formula One drivers
March Formula One drivers
Theodore Formula One drivers
Williams Formula One drivers
European Formula Two Championship drivers
Living people
Motorsport announcers
Irish expatriate sportspeople in the United States
Naturalized citizens of the United States
Sportspeople from County Dublin
Television anchors from Indianapolis
Formula Ford drivers
24 Hours of Le Mans drivers
World Sportscar Championship drivers
12 Hours of Sebring drivers
People educated at Ardscoil Rís, Limerick
Derek
Nismo drivers
BMW M drivers
Jaguar Racing drivers